The 1998 Copa del Rey Final was the 96th final of the Spanish cup competition, the Copa del Rey. The final was played at the Mestalla Stadium in Valencia on 29 April 1998. The game was won by Barcelona 5–4 on penalties, after a 1–1 draw following extra time.

Details

References

1998
1
FC Barcelona matches
RCD Mallorca matches
Association football penalty shoot-outs